1 Decembrie is a commune in the south of Ilfov County, Muntenia, Romania, composed of a single village, 1 Decembrie. It also included Copăceni village until 2005, when it was split off to form a separate commune. It has a population of 9,436, of which 9,067 (96.08%) are Romanians and 363 (3.84%) are Roma (Gypsies).

Originally named Copăcenii de Sus, in the 1930s the village changed its name to Regele Ferdinand, in memory of King Ferdinand of Romania. 

After the Communist takeover in mid-1940s, the name was changed to 30 Decembrie (December 30), to commemorate the day when the country became a republic in 1947. 

In 1996, following the Romanian Revolution, the name was changed to 1 Decembrie (December 1) - the day when the Kingdom of Romania was united with Transylvania in 1918.

Notes

Communes in Ilfov County
Localities in Muntenia